Aristostomias is a genus of barbeled dragonfishes native to the ocean depths in the Pacific, Atlantic and Indian oceans.

Red Light Bioluminescence

Production of red light bioluminescence 
Similar to other deep-sea organisms that are capable of producing red light bioluminescence, including Pachystomias, Aristostomias has large suborbital photophores that produce red-shifted cold light. In addition, Aristostomias has postorbital photophores that emit blue-green light.

Visual systems 
Most meso- and bathypelagic fish are only able to see shortwave light, as their retinae possess rods with rhodopsins sensitive to blue light. Aristostomias is able to detect red-shifted light, as their retinae have long-wave absorbing rhodopsins and porphyropsins that can detect wavelengths of up to 590 nm. Aristostomias can detect red light at distances of up to 2 meters, suggesting that detection is used primarily for close-range intraspecific communication and short-range prey detection.

Species
There are currently six recognized species in this genus:
 Aristostomias grimaldii Zugmayer, 1913
 Aristostomias lunifer Regan & Trewavas, 1930
 Aristostomias polydactylus Regan & Trewavas, 1930
 Aristostomias scintillans (C. H. Gilbert, 1915) (Shiny loosejaw)
 Aristostomias tittmanni W. W. Welsh, 1923 (Loosejaw)
 Aristostomias xenostoma Regan & Trewavas, 1930

References

Stomiidae
Marine fish genera
Ray-finned fish genera
Taxa named by Erich Zugmayer